Kuria is a Bantu language spoken by the Kuria people of Northern Tanzania, with some speakers also residing in Kenya.

Maho (2009) treats the  Simbiti, Hacha, Surwa, and Sweta varieties as distinct languages.

Alphabet

Phonology

Consonants

Vowels

All vowels contrast length, and can be either short or long.

Bibliography 
 Jelle Cammenga, Igikuria phonology and morphology : a Bantu language of South-West Kenya and North-West Tanzania, Köppe, Köln, 2004, 351 p.  (revised text of a thesis) 
 S. M. Muniko, B. Muita oMagige and M. J. Ruel (ed.), Kuria-English dictionary, LIT, Hambourg, 1996, 137 p. 
 W. H. Whiteley, The structure of the Kuria verbal and its position in the sentence, University of London, 1955, 161 p. (thesis)
 Phebe Yoder, Tata na Baba = Father and Mother : a first Kuria reader, Musoma Press, Musoma, Tanganyika, 1949, 44 p.

References

Languages of Tanzania
Languages of Kenya
Great Lakes Bantu languages